Bucznik may refer to the following places in Poland:

Bucznik, Pomeranian Voivodeship
Bucznik, West Pomeranian Voivodeship